Urotheca is a genus of snakes of the family Colubridae. The genus is endemic to the New World.

Geographic range
Species in the genus Urotheca are found in Central America and northwestern South America.

Species
Eight species are recognized as being valid.
 Urotheca decipiens (Günther, 1893)
 Urotheca dumerilli (Bibron, 1840)
 Urotheca fulviceps (Cope, 1886)
 Urotheca guentheri (Dunn, 1938)
 Urotheca lateristriga (Berthold, 1859)
 Urotheca multilineata (W. Peters, 1863)
 Urotheca myersi Savage & Lahanas, 1989
 Urotheca pachyura (Cope, 1875)

Nota bene: A binomial authority in parentheses indicates that the species was originally described in a genus other than Urotheca.

Etymology
The specific name, dumerilii, is in honor of French herpetologist André Marie Constant Duméril. The specific name, guentheri, is in honor of German-born British herpetologist Albert Günther. The specific name, myersi, is in honor of American herpetologist Charles William Myers.

References

Further reading
Bibron G (1843). In: Cocteau JT & Bibron G (1843). "Reptiles ". pp. 1–143. In: de la Sagra R (1843). Historia Fisica, Politica y Natural de la Isla de Cuba. Segunda Parte. Historia Natural. Tomo IV. Reptiles y Peces. [= Physical, Political and Natural History of the Island of Cuba. Second Part. Natural History. Volume 4. Reptiles and Fishes]. Paris: A. Bertrand. 255 pp. + Plates I-V. (Urotheca, new genus, p. 131). (in Spanish and Latin).

Urotheca
Snake genera
Taxa named by Gabriel Bibron